Shamrock Park is an eastern suburb of the city of Auckland, New Zealand. The area is bounded on the northwest by Chapel Road and Kilkenny Drive, on the northeast by Whitford Road, and on the east by Mangemangeroa Creek. Shamrock Park has many of its streets named after Irish Towns.  

The earliest houses date from the 1890s, but most of the houses were built in the 1990s. In 1998, the major streets were defined, but the land to the south was rural.

Demographics

Botany North had a population of 2,532 at the 2018 New Zealand census, an increase of 432 people (20.6%) since the 2013 census, and an increase of 483 people (23.6%) since the 2006 census. There were 777 households, comprising 1,200 males and 1,332 females, giving a sex ratio of 0.9 males per female. The median age was 49.1 years (compared with 37.4 years nationally), with 390 people (15.4%) aged under 15 years, 405 (16.0%) aged 15 to 29, 987 (39.0%) aged 30 to 64, and 753 (29.7%) aged 65 or older.

Ethnicities were 50.1% European/Pākehā, 2.6% Māori, 2.3% Pacific peoples, 47.5% Asian, and 2.7% other ethnicities. People may identify with more than one ethnicity.

The percentage of people born overseas was 50.8, compared with 27.1% nationally.

Although some people chose not to answer the census's question about religious affiliation, 42.5% had no religion, 38.2% were Christian, 5.5% were Hindu, 2.0% were Muslim, 3.2% were Buddhist and 2.5% had other religions.

Of those at least 15 years old, 612 (28.6%) people had a bachelor's or higher degree, and 357 (16.7%) people had no formal qualifications. The median income was $28,200, compared with $31,800 nationally. 414 people (19.3%) earned over $70,000 compared to 17.2% nationally. The employment status of those at least 15 was that 798 (37.3%) people were employed full-time, 228 (10.6%) were part-time, and 45 (2.1%) were unemployed.

Education

References

Suburbs of Auckland
Howick Local Board Area